Clifford "Jack" Paul (born c. 1931) is a former American football player and coach. He served as the head football coach at Edward Waters College in Jacksonville, Florida. In 1965, he was hired as the head football coach at Texas Southern University, where he remained for five seasons.

Head coaching record

References

Year of birth missing (living people)
Living people
Edward Waters Tigers athletic directors
Edward Waters Tigers football coaches
Texas Southern Tigers football coaches
Florida A&M University alumni
New York University alumni
African-American coaches of American football
African-American college athletic directors in the United States
20th-century African-American sportspeople
21st-century African-American sportspeople